The 1987 Kentucky Derby was the 113th running of the Kentucky Derby. The race took place on May 2, 1987, with 130,532 people in attendance.

Full results

 Winning Breeder: Preston Madden; (KY)

Payout

 $2 Exacta: (4-9) Paid $109.60

References

1987
Kentucky Derby
Derby
Kentucky
Kentucky Derby